Nissim Vaturi (born 23 October 1969) is an Israeli politician. He served as a member of the Knesset for Likud between 2020 and 2021.

Biography
Born in Rishon LeZion, Vaturi grew up in the Ramat Eliyahu neighborhood of the city. During his youth he was a member of the Rishon branch of the Betar youth movement, where he was a cadet of David Bitan. During his national service in the Israel Defense Forces  he served as a commander of an Israeli Air Force rescue team. He married a teacher, with whom he had seven children. The family moved to Alonei HaBashan in the Golan Heights in 2001 and he ran a cafe in Katzrin, but declared bankruptcy in 2015. He also worked as a political advisor to Bitan.

Vaturi was placed thirty-seventh on the Likud list for the April 2019 elections, but the party won only 35 seats. He was placed fortieth for the September 2019 elections, in which Likud won 32 seats. Although he missed out again in the March 2020 elections in which he was placed fortieth and Likud won 36 seats, he entered the Knesset on 11 December 2020 as a replacement for Gideon Sa'ar, who resigned after leaving Likud to establish his own party. Placed thirty-seventh on the Likud list for the March 2021 elections, he lost his seat as Likud was reduced to 30 seats. For the 2022 elections, he was placed twenty-first on Likud's list and was elected to the Knesset again, as Likud won thirty-two seats.

References

External links

1969 births
Living people
People from Rishon LeZion
Israeli settlers
Likud politicians
Members of the 23rd Knesset (2020–2021)
Members of the 25th Knesset (2022–)
Israeli people of Libyan-Jewish descent
Israeli people of Iraqi-Jewish descent
Jewish Israeli politicians